The 2022–23 VMI Keydets basketball team represented the Virginia Military Institute in the 2022–23 NCAA Division I men's basketball season. The Keydets, led by first-year head coach Andrew Wilson, played their home games in Cameron Hall in Lexington, Virginia, as members of the Southern Conference.

Previous season
The Keydets finished the 2021–22 season 16–16, 9–9 in SoCon play to finish in a tie for fifth place. In the SoCon tournament, they were defeated by Wofford in the quarterfinals. They were invited to the CBI, where they would lose in the first round to UNC Wilmington. On March 30, it was announced that head coach Dan Earl was leaving the program to take the head coaching position at Chattanooga. On April 12, the school announced that James Madison assistant Andrew Wilson would be the team's next head coach.

Roster

Schedule and results

|-
!colspan=12 style=| Non-conference regular season

|-
!colspan=12 style=| SoCon regular season

|-
!colspan=9 style=| SoCon Tournament

Sources

References

VMI Keydets basketball seasons
VMI Keydets basketball
VMI Keydets basketball
VMI Keydets basketball